Local elections were held in Quezon City on May 13, 2019 within the Philippine general election. Registered voters of the city elected candidates for the following elective local posts: mayor, vice mayor, district representative, and six councilors at-large for each district. There are six legislative districts in the city.

Electoral system

For mayor, vice mayor and representatives 
The winner is elected via the first-past-the-post system. The mayor and vice mayor are elected separately, and are elected at-large. Representatives are elected from each of Quezon City's 6 congressional districts.

For councilors 
The winners are elected via multiple non-transferable vote in each of Quezon City's 6 city council districts (coextensive with the congressional districts). A voter has six votes, and can vote up to six people. The six candidates with the highest number of votes in each district wins.

Tickets

Serbisyo sa Bayan Party/Serbisyo sa Bayan Party

Partido Demokratiko Pilipino-Lakas ng Bayan/Serbisyong Crisologo

Katipunan ng Demokratikong Pilipino

Pederalismo ng Dugong Dakilang Samahan

Philippine Green Republican Party

Pwersa ng Masang Pilipino

Partido ng Manggagawa

Independents

Mayoralty election

Vice mayoral election

Congressional elections

1st District

2nd District

3rd District

4th District

5th District

6th District

City Council elections

1st District

 

| colspan="7" style="background:black;"|

2nd District

| colspan="16" style="background:black;"|

3rd District

| colspan="17" style="background:black;"|

4th District

| colspan="6" style="background:black;"|

5th District

| colspan="7" style="background:black;"|

6th District

| colspan="12" style="background:black;"|

References

2019 Philippine local elections
Elections in Quezon City
Politics of Quezon City
May 2019 events in the Philippines
2019 elections in Metro Manila